The women's parallel slalom competition of the FIS Snowboarding World Championships 2011 was held at La Molina, Spain on January 22, 2011. 49 athletes from 21 countries competed.

Results

Qualification
The following are the results of the qualification. Each participant takes one run on either of the courses. After the first run, only the top 32 are allowed a second run on the opposite course.

Elimination round

References

Parallel slalom, women's